Chiaradia is anItalian surname. Notable people with the surname include:

 Eugenio Chiaradia (1911–1977), Italian bridge player
 Alfredo Chiaradía (born 1945), Argentine academic and policy maker

Italian-language surnames